Preobrazheniye (Lit. Transfiguration in Russian) may refer to:
Preobrazheniye, Primorsky Krai, an urban-type settlement in Primorsky Krai, Russia
Preobrazheniye, Tver Oblast, a village in Tver Oblast, Russia
Preobrazheniye Bay, a bay of Sea of Japan in Primorsky Krai